William Mansfield, 1st Viscount Sandhurst  (21 August 1855 – 2 November 1921) was a British Liberal politician and colonial governor. He was Governor of Bombay between 1895 and 1900 and Lord Chamberlain of the Household between 1912 and 1921.

Background and early life
Mansfield was the son of William Mansfield, 1st Baron Sandhurst, and Margaret, daughter of Robert Fellowes, and a noted suffragist. He served in the Coldstream Guards, achieving the rank of lieutenant.

Political career
Mansfield succeeded his father as Baron Sandhurst in 1876, aged 20, and was entitled to a seat in the House of Lords from his 21st birthday a few months later. When the Liberals came to power under William Ewart Gladstone in 1880, he was appointed a Lord-in-waiting, a post he held until 1885 when the Liberals left office. He was Under-Secretary of State for War in Gladstone's brief 1886 administration and again from 1892 to 1895 under Gladstone and Lord Rosebery. In 1895 he was made Governor of Bombay, a post he held until February 1900. After he had stepped down, he was appointed an extra Knight Grand Commander of the Order of the Star of India (GCSI) on 9 March 1900.

Lord Sandhurst did not initially serve in the Liberal administrations headed by Sir Henry Campbell-Bannerman and H. H. Asquith but was sworn of the Privy Council in 1907. He did return to ministerial office in 1912 when Asquith appointed him Lord Chamberlain of the Household (succeeding his brother-in-law Lord Spencer). He continued in this post until his death in 1921, the last five years under the premiership of David Lloyd George. In 1917 he was made Viscount Sandhurst, of Sandhurst in the County of Berkshire.

According to the historian David Gilmour, Sandhurst was "regarded by his brother officers in the Coldstream Guards as ‘incurably dense’ [and] considered by officials in his presidency to be almost illiterate."

Family 
Lord Sandhurst married, firstly, Lady Victoria, daughter of Frederick Spencer, 4th Earl Spencer, on 20 July 1881. They had two children, who both died in infancy: The Honourable John Robert Mansfield (4 September 1882–5 September 1882) and the Honourable Elizabeth Mansfield (9 June 1884–17 October 1884).

After his first wife's death in March 1906 he married secondly Eleanor, younger daughter of Matthew Arnold and widow of Armine Wodehouse, on 5 July 1909. There were no children from this marriage.

Lord Sandhurst died in 1921, aged 66. The viscountcy became extinct on his death while the barony was inherited by his brother, John Mansfield. Lady Sandhurst died in December 1934.

Arms

References

External links

1855 births
1921 deaths
Viscounts in the Peerage of the United Kingdom
Knights Grand Cross of the Royal Victorian Order
Knights Grand Commander of the Order of the Indian Empire
Knights Grand Commander of the Order of the Star of India
Members of the Privy Council of the United Kingdom
Governors of Bombay
Liberal Party (UK) Lords-in-Waiting
Members of London County Council
Progressive Party (London) politicians
Members of the London School Board
Members of the Bombay Legislative Council
Eldest sons of British hereditary barons
Viscounts created by George V